Shaun Walker may mean:
 Shaun Walker (software developer), creator of the DNN web application framework
 Shaun Walker (white supremacist), a leader of the National Alliance organization in the United States 
 Shaun Walker (journalist), a foreign correspondent for UK newspapers The Independent and The Guardian